The Baltics Are Waking Up! is a trilingual song composed by Boriss Rezniks for the occasion of the Baltic Way, a large demonstration against the Soviet Union for independence of the Baltic States in commemoration of the 50th anniversary of the Molotov–Ribbentrop Pact. The song is sometimes regarded as the joint anthem of the Baltics. The Lithuanian text was sung by Žilvinas Bubelis, Latvian by Viktors Zemgals, and Estonian by Tarmo Pihlap.

See also
Baltic Way
Singing Revolution

References

External links
A Youtube video showing the Baltic Way, August 1989. Lyrics: Latvian, Lithuanian, Estonian
Texts of the song in three languages and translation into English

Estonian songs
Latvian songs
Lithuanian songs
1989 in the Soviet Union
Macaronic songs
1989 songs